College Tevragh Zeina is a college in Tevragh-Zeina, Nouakchott, Mauritania. It is located just to the southwest of  Hôtel Tfeila, near the Moroccan and Russian embassy.

References

Nouakchott
Universities in Mauritania